Choszczówko  is a settlement in the administrative district of Gmina Dębno, within Myślibórz County, West Pomeranian Voivodeship, in north-western Poland. 

The settlement has a population of 55.

References

Villages in Myślibórz County